Solaster stimpsoni, common names Stimpson's sun star, sun star, orange sun star, striped sunstar, and sun sea star, is a species of starfish in the family Solasteridae.

Description

Solaster stimpsoni is a large species, growing up to 50 cm in diameter. It can have 8 to 12 arms, but usually has 10. The aboral surface has a distinctive reddish orange colour and is covered with thick paxillae. The arms are long, slender, and tapering, each with a dark, purplish-grey contrasting stripe, running from the centre of the body to the tip. They contain no pedicellariae. The underside of the arms have two rows of tube feet.

Distribution
This species is found in the seas of Japan, and along the western coast of the United States, from central California, to as far north as Alaska.

Habitat
Solaster stimpsoni usually lives on rocky surfaces in the subtidal, and occasionally the low inter-tidal zones, at depths from 0 to 610 meters.

Diet
This starfish feeds on various small sea cucumbers, such as Cucumaria miniata, Cucumaria curata, Eupentacta quinquesemita, Eupentacta pseudoquinquesemita, and Psolus chitonoides. It also eats brachiopods, ascidians, or sea pens.

Predators
Solaster stimpsoni is eaten by a close relative, Solaster dawsoni, the morning sunstar.

References

Solaster
Fauna of the Pacific Ocean
Animals described in 1880
Taxa named by Addison Emery Verrill